The 2005 IIHF Ice Hockey World Championship was held 30 April – 15 May 2005 in Vienna and Innsbruck, Austria. It was the 69th annual event, and was run by the International Ice Hockey Federation (IIHF).

Venues

Rosters

Preliminary round

Sixteen participating teams were placed in the following four groups. After playing a round-robin, the top three teams in each group advanced to the qualifying round. The last team in each group competed in the relegation round.

Group A 

All times local (UTC +3)

Group B 

All times local (UTC +3)

Group C 

All times local (UTC +3)

Group D 

All times local (UTC +3)

Qualifying round
The top three teams from each group in the First Round advance to the qualifying round.  The top three teams from Groups A and D advance to Group E, and the top three teams from Groups B and C advance to Group F.

Teams in the qualifying round carry forward the results and points gained in the preliminary round with the teams that they have played and advance with. Teams, which have played in the preliminary round, do not meet again in the qualifying round.

Group E

All times local (UTC+3)

Group F

Relegation round
The consolation round is composed of the four teams that placed last in Groups A through D.  They play in a round-robin fashion, and the bottom two teams get relegated to the Division I group in next year's World Championships.

Group G

All times local (UTC +3)

Playoff round

Bracket

Quarter-finals

Semi-finals

Bronze medal game

Gold medal game

Ranking and statistics

Tournament Awards
Best players selected by the directorate:
Best Goaltender:       Tomáš Vokoun
Best Defenceman:       Wade Redden
Best Forward:          Alexei Kovalev
Most Valuable Player:  Joe Thornton
Media All-Star Team:
Goaltender:  Tomáš Vokoun
Defence:  Niklas Kronwall,  Marek Židlický
Forwards:  Jaromír Jágr,  Rick Nash,  Joe Thornton

Final standings
The final standings of the tournament according to IIHF:

Scoring leaders
List shows the top skaters sorted by points, then goals. If the list exceeds 10 skaters because of a tie in points, all of the tied skaters are left out.
Source:

Leading goaltenders
Only the top five goaltenders, based on save percentage, who have played 40% of their team's minutes are included in this list.
Source:

See also
2005 in ice hockey
2005 IIHF World U18 Championships
2005 World Junior Ice Hockey Championships

References

External links 
2005 IIHF World Championship official site

 
IIHF World Championship
1
World championships
International ice hockey competitions hosted by Austria
Sports competitions in Vienna
Sports competitions in Innsbruck
April 2005 sports events in Europe
May 2005 sports events in Europe
2000s in Vienna
2000s in Innsbruck